Jarrod Lienert (born 5 August 1994) is a professional Australian rules footballer playing for the St Kilda Football Club in the Australian Football League (AFL). He made his debut in round 18 of the 2018 season against  at Adelaide Oval. Jarrod is the son of Brett Lienert who played 134 games for Sturt.

Lienert played junior football for Imperial Football Club in Murray Bridge, South Australia. He joined South Australian National Football League (SANFL) club Sturt, playing as a utility, and was part of their 2016 premiership. In the same year, he won the SANFL Star Search award as a promising talent. He was drafted by Port Adelaide with pick 42 in the 2017 rookie draft, while studying to become a teacher. In 2017, he played 21 SANFL games as a key defender, including Port Adelaide's one-point grand final loss. He was upgraded to the senior list in August.

In 2018, Lienert showed strong SANFL form before having an arthroscope on his right knee to repair his meniscus, sidelining him for two months. In the lead-up to the match against Greater Western Sydney, coach Ken Hinkley confirmed Lienert would debut, commenting "he probably would've played well before this (if not for the knee surgery) ... he's playing some really strong football".

Lienert made his St Kilda debut in Round 2, 2022 in the Saints' win against Fremantle. Lienert managed 11 games before getting delisted at the end of the 2022 season.

References

External links 

 

Living people
1994 births
Sturt Football Club players
Port Adelaide Magpies players
Port Adelaide Football Club players
St Kilda Football Club players
Port Adelaide Football Club players (all competitions)
People from Murray Bridge, South Australia
Australian rules footballers from South Australia
Indigenous Australian players of Australian rules football